Rariglobus is a genus of bacteria from the family of Opitutaceae with one known species Rariglobus hedericola. Rariglobus hederico has been isolated from a freshwater ditch in Eugendorf.

References

Verrucomicrobiota
Bacteria genera
Monotypic bacteria genera
Taxa described in 2020